Charaxes agrarius, the anomalous nawab, is a butterfly found in Asia that belongs to the rajahs and nawabs group, that is, the Charaxinae subfamily of the brush-footed butterflies family. The name is based on their resemblance to the common nawab (Polyura athamas), which was described before the discovery of this species.

Description

See also
Polyura athamas
List of butterflies of India (Nymphalidae)

Footnotes

References
 
 

Polyura